Travel Holiday was an American magazine title born in 1977 when the publisher of Travel acquired Holiday magazine and merged the titles. The magazine ceased publication in 2003.

Travel Holiday had its origins in The Four-Track News, a creation of New York Central railroad publicist George H. Daniels, and published by the railroad from 1901 to 1906. As Daniels approached retirement, The Four-Track News became The Travel Magazine in a large format under a new publisher, Travel Bureau, Inc. 

In 1910, Travel Bureau, Inc. folded and its sole product was taken over by the McBride publishing house which soon shortened its title to Travel. The successful promoter of House and Garden, McBride promised a worldwide scope and more photography in a magazine directed both at those who could afford to travel and those who could not. In the 1920s and '30s, Travel was noted for the artwork commissioned for its covers. McBride went bankrupt in 1948 and the title was bought by Long Island publisher Herman W. Shane, who added to it a tagline: Travel: the magazine that roams the globe. Management eventually passed to his son, Sheldon R. Shane, and the revived title was a success in the prosperous postwar years.  

In 1977, Sheldon Shane acquired Holiday from the struggling Curtis Publishing Company. Holiday was an established, rival travel magazine that featured upscale art design and commissioned famous authors to write its stories.

At the time of the $1.2M sale, Holiday had a circulation of 368,000, Travel 592,368. Shane merged the titles to create Travel Holiday, and his son, Scott E. Shane, soon came on as editor. It was considered a prestigious magazine that restaurants vied to get published in its pages as an awarded business of note. In 1986, Shane sold Travel Holiday to the Reader's Digest Association and became a part of their travel series. At the time the magazine had a monthly circulation of 778,000.  In 1996, Reader's Digest sold the magazine to Hachette Filipacchi Media U.S., a French media firm.  Hachette Filipacchi discontinued the magazine in 2003 due to low advertising revenue.

Until the Shanes left management in 1989, Travel Holiday kept the ‘roam the globe’ tagline, maintained the volume number sequence begun with The Four-Track News, and proclaimed continuous publication since 1901.

Early background
Travel magazine had its origins in The Four-Track News, a travel and educational  magazine developed in 1901 by George Henry Daniels, a publicist hired by New York Central to promote the railroad through travel. Its title evoked the NYC's four track system, a phrase coined by Daniels. It was first a brochure which developed into a magazine, with Daniels as its main editor. The magazine was a supplement and sequel to the Four-Track Series guidebook brochures that were being published in the 1890s by the New York Central. Daniels was hired as their General Passenger Agent with the idea to publicize the railroad company, getting passengers and selling tours. Daniels researched the travel articles in the magazine, but he also had other writers that specialized on certain global geography and historical information. Some of the issues covered the history of the New York Central from its beginning in 1831. The magazines had around 100 pages and were illustrated with dozens of images and pictures in each issue.

Four-Track News

Origins 
George Henry Daniels was hired in 1889 by the New York Central and Hudson River Railroad as manager of their passenger department. At the time, the railroad had the only four track system in the world, and Daniels promoted it. As the General Passenger Agent in 1890, he had issued free travel brochures of a few pages to promote tours. These were expanded in 1891 to pamphlets of about a dozen pages. The pamphlets were expanded further as time went on to about twenty pages. By 1892 these brochures were over thirty pages in a tour guide format that were booklets of information on regional geography and local history. These tour guidebooks were designated the Four-Track Series and were advertisements for the railroad company showing benefits and advantages of rail travel. The guidebooks gave the destinations traveled by the New York Central railroad company. There were thirty-five booklets ( X ) published in the series by the passenger department of the New York Central.

One of the 1892 guidebooks in the Four-Track Series of the New York Central railroad was an illustrated thirty-two-page pamphlet on "The Lake Region of Central New York." It gave geography, history, and cultural information on several of the New York state lakes including Otsego, Otisco and Onondaga. It was designed to get people to travel by rail to the region for summer vacations. The New York Central railroad offered this guidebook for free at the New York Central's offices or mailed upon receipt of postage at Grand Central Station in downtown New York City.

In 1893 there had been 14 different travel guidebooks published in the Four-Track Series. The tenth guidebook was about the advantages of the Thousand Islands region of upper New York State and had articles on activities and accommodations. This guidebook was experimented with by the New York Central railroad as an international advertisement edition in 1892. The fifteenth guidebook in 1894 was titled “Fishing among the Thousand Islands". Other guidebooks that followed had subjects like “The Adirondack Mountains”, “Two Days at Niagara Falls” and “The Luxury of Modern Railway Travel”. The railroad company would publish up to 40 Four-Track Series guidebooks as the years passed. The Four-Track Series guidebooks grew to about a hundred pages. Descriptions of other regions that became of interest were expanded in each of the guidebooks. Advertising had also increased with the larger guidebooks. These guidebooks contained travel information and competed with other travel books. The Four-Track Series guidebooks cost ten cents, or a person could send the cost of postage stamps to Daniels and receive a guidebook complimentary by mail.

Publication 

The Four-Track News came about in 1901 as a monthly pamphlet published under the direction of Daniels. The publication was designed as an auxiliary to the Four-Track Series guidebooks. Some of the issues of the new publication gave the history of the New York Central railroad from 1831 and how the line developed.

The monthly circulation of the Four-Track News in 1902 was some 80,000 copies with subscriptions worldwide. The Four-Track News advertised escorted tours by the New York Central railroad company from New York City, Boston, and Philadelphia going to California, Mexico, West Indies, Europe, and other international destinations.

The Four-Track News magazine then had a new subtitle of "A Monthly Magazine of Travel and Education." It had additional information that supplemented the Four-Track Series guidebooks. Some issues gave information relating to the development of rail transportation in the twentieth century. This new magazine had illustrations of regional and local custom scenery of the United States and foreign countries of Europe and Asia. The supplemental magazine was intended to be an education on global travel. The Four-Track News magazine gave additional knowledge not provided by the Four-Track Series and showed where New York Central railroad lines went to in Colorado, Utah, California, Oregon, and Washington. Each issue of Four-Track News had over 100 pages and was illustrated with images and pictures. It had a niche of its own in the literary world because of its manner of travel education.

Daniels advertised in other magazines by 1904 looking for merchants and dealers that wished to advertise in the Four-Track News. Advantages listed in the advertisement included that his travel magazine reached at least 100,000 people each month by 1904, had a field entirely its own as an illustrated educational travel magazine, had attractive illustrations and feature articles by professional writers, and gave discounts to those that advertised continuously. The price for advertising a full page in the Four-Track News in 1904 was $100.

Cost 
The Four-Track News publication in 1901 was a brochure and was also available by mail by sending Daniels a two-cent stamp for postage. The publication became a magazine in 1902 and cost 5 cents for each monthly issue and contained 64 pages. A person could get a yearly subscription for 50 cents. Beginning in 1905, the cost was increased to 10 cents for each monthly issue or one dollar for a yearly subscription, with foreign countries paying $1.50 per year. The magazine publication had over 100 pages starting in January 1905. Renewing subscribers only had to pay 50 cents for 1905, but beginning in 1906, it was raised to $1 per year.

 Sample of Four-Track News illustrations in 1906 issues showing Tahiti.

References

Sources

Further reading

External links
Travel at the HathiTrust. Links to its holdings of The Four Track News, The Travel Magazine, and Travel, 1904-1940.
Travel Holiday 1971-2003 at the Internet Archive.

Visual arts magazines published in the United States
Defunct magazines published in the United States
Magazines established in 1901
Magazines disestablished in 1977
Tourism magazines
Magazines published in New York City
Lifestyle magazines
Magazines published in the United States
Magazines disestablished in 2003